Bulyea   is a village in the Canadian province of Saskatchewan within the Rural Municipality of McKillop No. 220 and Census Division No. 6.

History 
Bulyea was first settled in 1882-1883 by immigrants from the United Kingdom and Ireland, and later people of Norwegian and German origins. Bulyea incorporated as a village on March 9, 1909. It was named after George H. V. Bulyea, a former member of the North-West Legislative Assembly and later the first Lieutenant Governor of Alberta.

Demographics 

Sports
A Bulyea senior men's ice hockey team was one of five founding members in 1965 of the Highway Hockey League in central Saskatchewan.

See also
 List of communities in Saskatchewan
 Villages of Saskatchewan

References

Villages in Saskatchewan
McKillop No. 220, Saskatchewan
Division No. 6, Saskatchewan